Based on Roman Catholic tradition, the Anima Sola or Lonely Soul is an image depicting a soul in purgatory, popular in Latin America, as well as much of Andalusia, Naples and Palermo.

Brief history
While scholars have thus far not provided a history of the Anima Sola (or Ánimas del purgatorio in Spanish), the practice of praying for the souls in purgatory extends at least as far back as the Council of Trent in which the following was determined:

"Whereas the Catholic Church, instructed by the Holy Ghost, has from the Sacred Scriptures and the ancient tradition of the Fathers taught in Councils and very recently in this Ecumenical synod (Sess. VI, cap. XXX; Sess. XXII cap.ii, iii) that there is a purgatory, and that the souls therein are helped by the suffrages of the faithful, but principally by the acceptable Sacrifice of the Altar; the Holy Synod enjoins on the Bishops that they diligently endeavor to have the sound doctrine of the Fathers in Councils regarding purgatory everywhere taught and preached, held and believed by the faithful" (Denzinger, "Enchiridon", 983).

Various interpretations of the image
The Anima Sola is taken to represent a soul suffering in purgatory. While in many cases chromolithographs depict a female soul, many other figures such as popes and other men are commonly depicted in chromolithographs, sculptures and paintings. In the most commonly known image of the Anima Sola, a woman is depicted as breaking free from her chains in a dungeon setting surrounded by flames, representing purgatory. She appears penitent and reverent, and her chains have been broken, an indication that, after her temporary suffering, she is destined for heaven.

Praying to the Anima Sola is a tradition in many ways unlike that of the more widespread cult of saints. In lieu of praying to a saint who then appeals to God, the Anima Sola represents souls in purgatory who require the assistance both of the living and the divine to ameliorate their sufferings in the afterlife.

The Anima Sola is common throughout much of the Catholic world, though is perhaps strongest in Naples, where it is referred to as "the cult of the souls in Purgatory." In Latin America, one source reports,  the Anima Sola is "a belief still deeply rooted in the mass of the campesinos. The devotion dates from the first colonizers, who probably brought the image in which the soul is represented as a woman suffering torments in purgatory with chains binding her hands. A legend concerning the 'thirst of Christ', about which Scripture says Jesus thirsted on the Cross, passes from mouth to mouth: They say that in Jerusalem, there were women who gave drink to those who were being crucified. On the afternoon of Good Friday it fell to a young woman, Celestina Abdenago, to go up Calvary. From a jar she gave a drink to Dismas and Gestas, yet she despised the Saviour; and for that reason, he condemned her to suffer thirst and the constant heat of purgatory."

Magical traditions
As with many Catholic symbols, the image also appears in spiritist traditions.  As described in The Element Encyclopedia of 5000 Spells by Judika Illes:

Another interpretation is that the sacred figures most frequently invoked include the "Lonely Soul" [Anima Sola], who requires prayers because of her predicament; San Silvestre, magical because of the date of his feast day; and Santa Elena and San Onofre.

Santería and Lukumi
In Santería or Lukumi, the Afro-Caribbean religion of Cuba, there is a syncretization of the Anima Sola with the Eshu Alleguana.  The Eshus are the Divine Messengers, the Tricksters, The Masters of the Roads and the Doors that are necessary for all prayers to reach their intended point.  Eshu Allegwanna, one Eshu among hundreds, is thought to be the oldest of the Eshus, and to have existed on the Earth since a primordial time long before not only people, but before many of the gods of the religion, existed in the world.  Therefore, he is synchronized with The Lonely Spirit, as many of the African Gods were syncretized with Catholic saints, or hidden behind them, in the first centuries of slavery, when the practice of the African religions were oppressed.  Anima Sola is grouped in a triad in some traditions with The Intranquil Spirit and the Dominant Spirit.

References

Afterlife places
Catholic theology and doctrine
Christian eschatology
Christian terminology
Christianity and death
Magic (supernatural)
Santería